"New Jack City" is the ninth episode of the second series of the Channel 4 television sitcom Father Ted.

At the inaugural Ted Fest in February 2007, it was voted the best Father Ted episode.

Synopsis

Father Jack contracts "Hairy Hands Syndrome" (level 6 out of a maximum 12) and is sent to St. Clabbert's Hospital for wayward priests (jokingly referred to as "Jurassic Park" by the Clergymen of Craggy Island, after the film of the same title). He is visibly alarmed upon learning from Ted that he will be going to "Jurassic Park", and tries to escape by riding on a lawnmower, but to no avail.

A new priest replaces Jack while he is on leave: Father Fintan Stack, an obnoxious, rude and destructive priest, who torments Ted and Dougal. Stack's torments include deliberately driving Ted's car into a wall and then telling him all about it and saying that all that mattered was that he liked it, insulting Ted and his friends in the priesthood, getting Dougal drunk on Jack's whiskey, drilling holes in the living room wall for no particular reason and blasting jungle music (Cutty Ranks’ “Limb By Limb”) at 3 o'clock in the morning. In a discussion with Dougal during a sleepless night (courtesy of Stack), Ted labels him "worse than Hitler", because "you wouldn't find Hitler playing jungle music at 3 o'clock in the morning".

Fed up with Stack, Ted and Dougal kidnap Father Jack back from St. Clabbert's Hospital, which is full of elderly priests with a similar demeanour to Jack (except for one who says "I really shouldn't be here"). Jack returns to the parochial house with Ted and Dougal, desperate for a drink. He is furious when he finds out that his booze stash is gone and prepares to punch Stack out for going after his whiskey, but stops himself after noticing that Stack has caught the "Hairy Hands Syndrome" from sitting in Jack's chair, which Dougal forgot to disinfect before Stack arrived. Stack is sent to St. Clabbert's Hospital and everything in the parochial house returns to normal, though Jack is locked in a hermetically sealed chamber to prevent him from passing the "Hairy Hands Syndrome" on to anyone else, which Ted considers an improvement.

Meanwhile at St. Clabbert's, Father Stack still insists on playing his jungle music, distracting the other residents.

Production
Pat Laffan auditioned for the role of Father Stack. He later appeared as the villainous milkman Pat Mustard in "Speed 3", in the third series.
Fr. Stack's jungle music is Limb By Limb (Dj SS Remix) by Cutty Ranks and The Way (The VIP Mix) by DJ Taktix.
The episode was named after the film New Jack City.
Mrs. Doyle parodies the opening scene of Dont Look Back, a 1967 documentary film by D. A. Pennebaker that principally covers Bob Dylan's 1965 concert tour of the United Kingdom.

References

External links

 
 Cutty Ranks - Limb By Limb - DJ SS Remix (YouTube)
 DJ Taktix - The Way - The VIP Mix (YouTube)

Father Ted episodes
1996 British television episodes